Ronan Kealy, known as Junior Brother (born 1993), is an Irish alternative folk singer-songwriter from County Kerry.

Early life
Kealy grew up in County Kerry. He attended St Brendan's College, Killarney and studied English in University College Cork and Ballyfermot College of Further Education.

Career
Junior Brother moved to Dublin in 2014 to begin his career. His stage name is taken from a character in the Elizabethan play The Revenger's Tragedy. He was named as one of RTÉ's Rising Irish Stars of 2018, and as one of The Irish Times' "Irish music contenders ready to break through in 2019". His first album, Pull The Right Rope, was nominated for the Choice Music Prize. In a 4-star review for The Irish Times, music journalist Tony Clayton-Lea wrote: "...the tales told here are full of wide-eyed wonders and keen observations. Between the clatter of one and clarity of the other, Junior Brother’s songs are the real deal." Music website The Last Mixed Tape wrote of the album: "An album of pure expression, Pull The Right Rope is a masterclass in the sheer joy of creation." In March 2019 he appeared on The Tommy Tiernan Show, and in April 2020 on Other Voices (Irish TV series).

Discography

EP

PowPig/Junior Brother (2019; a 4-A-side single with fellow artist PowPig)

Studio albums

Pull The Right Rope (2019)

Awards and nominations

Choice Music Prize

RTÉ Radio 1 Folk Awards

References

External links
Junior Brother on Bandcamp

1993 births
Irish folk singers
21st-century Irish people
Living people
Musicians from County Kerry
Irish male singers